Cannabis in Austria is legal for scientific and medical usage, but illegal for recreational usage. Possession of small amounts for personal use was decriminalized in 2016. The sale of cannabis seeds and plants is legal.

Medical cannabis
On 9 July 2008, the Austrian Parliament approved cannabis cultivation for scientific and medical uses. Cannabis cultivation is controlled by the Austrian Agency for Health and Food Safety (Österreichische Agentur für Gesundheit und Ernährungssicherheit, AGES).

Decriminalization
On 1 January 2016, new regulations went into effect in Austria which almost removed criminal penalties for personal possession of cannabis.

Law and situation
Both Δ9-THC and pharmaceutical preparations containing Δ9-THC are listed in annex IV of the Austrian Narcotics Decree (Suchtgiftverordnung). Compendial formulations are manufactured upon prescription according to the German Neues Rezeptur-Formularium.

References

Austria
Drug policy of Austria